Alexandre Dumoulin (born 24 August 1989) is a French rugby union player. His position is centre and he currently plays for Montpellier in the Top 14. In January 2015 he was named in the France 31-man squad for the 2015 Six Nations Championship by coach Philippe Saint-André.	
He made his debut for France on 8 November 2014 against Fiji.

References

External links
ESPN Profile
itsrugby Profile

People from Bourgoin-Jallieu
1989 births
Living people
French rugby union players
Rugby union centres
Sportspeople from Isère
France international rugby union players